Ann Island is an island in the Debenham Islands, lying southeast of Barbara Island, off the west coast of Graham Land. Discovered by the British Graham Land Expedition (BGLE), 1934–37, under John Riddoch Rymill, and named by him for a daughter of Frank Debenham, a member of the BGLE Advisory Committee.

See also 
 List of Antarctic and sub-Antarctic islands

References
 

Islands of Graham Land
Fallières Coast